Minerva is an episodic series of single-player modifications ("mods") for Valve's Half-Life 2. The mod was created by Adam Foster. Installments are released as each is finalized: the three releases for the Metastasis chapter have already been made, with the third installment released on October 1, 2007.

The plot and settings of Minerva are linked to Someplace Else, Foster's original map for Half-Life, and to Half-Life 2 itself.

The mod was released on Steam on April 30, 2013.

Plot

Storyline 
Minerva takes place in the Half-Life universe. Part of the first level is played in and around a World War II bunker, placed in an unknown, oceanic location, identified in the mod's blog as the Baltic Sea. The player assumes the role of an unnamed protagonist, hinted to be a renegade member of the Combine Overwatch, infiltrating, exploring, and ultimately destroying the Combine base on the island.

In contrast to Half-Life 2, no non-hostile characters or dialogue ever appear; instead, the player is aided by a mysterious guide, the eponymous "Minerva", whom also serves to relay story information to the player. Though Minerva is never seen, she stylizes herself as a "goddess", with messages indicating she is somewhere in Earth's orbit aboard a satellite.

The plot is progressed through radio messages from Minerva, relayed as text rather than spoken words. Minerva's communications initially are sarcastic and dismissive, and her demeanour brusque, treating the player as a data-gathering tool at her disposal. Information and storyline is revealed in short segments over the course of the chapters, often with no explanation; for example, in Metastasis she reveals that her (and therefore the player's) goal is to discover the Combine's purposes on and underneath the episode's island, but not why she considers this important or how the player became involved in the first place.

As the story progresses the protagonist fights through the base's lower levels, discovering a massive portal by which the Combine are teleporting soldiers. This shocks Minerva, who states that it leads to a world the Combine are sieging. Minerva betrays the protagonist after he sabotages the Combine's defenses, activating an orbital laser and attempting to destroy the base as she declares him a "redeemed traitor." He survives, however, and Minerva becomes apologetic, later admitting she has grown "attached" to him. She explains that the portal, wherever it may lead, could mean the difference between life and death for billions of people, hence her desperation to destroy it. She urges him to escape as she recharges the satellite's laser, as the Combine have become aware of her location and she fears retribution. With the aid of Minerva and a stolen helicopter, the protagonist fights to the surface and escapes the island just as it is annihilated by a second orbital blast.

Minerva's communications are unusual in that each is prefixed by a time/date stamp in International Date Format (ISO 8601), giving an explicit timescale to the plot. These timestamps extend to several written pieces on the series' website that give background to the story. From these and the in-game messages it is possible to construct a partial timeline of events covered in the Minerva series.

Episode events

Metastasis
Metastasis is the first chapter in the Minerva series. It is divided into four episodes: Carcinogenesis, Downhill Struggle, Depth Charge, and Pegasus. Episodes 3 and 4 were released on October 1, 2007, which completed the first chapter.

Carcinogenesis

Metastasis 1 begins with the player being deposited on the shore of a mysterious island by a Combine helicopter. Under attack from the outset, the player must fight a path around the island to gain access to its center, guided on occasion by messages from Minerva.

Combat and exploration dominate gameplay in this first installment. Dropped in the water next to a wharf, the player must survive an initial firefight with Combine forces before getting his bearings.  The wharf with its collection of buildings is fenced off; the island's most obvious non-natural feature is a shimmering stream of plasma descending from the cloud cover straight into the island's center.  A circuitous tour of the island ensues, involving multiple variegated enemy engagements (at a distance, up close, elevated, bunkered, flanked), all set in a convincing and detailed rocky beach environment.  The outdoor tour ends at the wharf next to which the player is first deposited, the first of many such circles throughout the Minerva series.  Underground exploration with minimal combat follows, heightening tension and raising questions about what the Combine are doing on the island, the apparent aim of Minerva's "scientific investigation."  A return to the surface yields more combat, access to the plasma stream's entry point, and the beginning of the descent down the beam's path that carries the episode to its conclusion and is continued in the next installment.

We learn little about Minerva or her goals, but her messages reveal a megalomaniacal, condescending, and sarcastic personality, and she seems to enjoy, but not assume, the player's continued survival.  Her oblique, intriguing comments drive the narrative just as combat drives the gameplay. Minerva also reveals that the plasma stream comes from a geosynchronous satellite and that the player's objective is to find out its purpose.

Downhill Struggle

The second level to Minerva is set inside a huge shaft found at the center of the strange island. As the player progresses downwards the level becomes much darker.

This installment involves slightly less combat, although the well placed enemies present a tougher challenge, and seems to be mostly about finding a route further down the shaft. At times this can be difficult with complex puzzles and a lot of backtracking required.

Once again you are directed by the invisible Minerva, who seems to become more sarcastic as the game progresses.

It is revealed that the user is not the only person Minerva has manipulated. She compares you against at least one other such avatar - perhaps a reference to Pericles but it is also possible it refers to the player character of Someplace Else. She also reveals that the player is actually a traitorous (or 'reprogrammed') Combine soldier, whom she has presumably provided with a Black Mesa HEV suit, or similar powered armor.

Depth Charge

The third level delves the player deeper and to the lowest floors of the shaft. The player loses his armaments in a weapons containment field, and for a large portion of the level the player must run from Combine soldiers while solving puzzles using crates. During this segment of gameplay, the player will stumble across the impressive core of the reactor that receives the energy of the plasma stream. It is apparently used to power a Combine Portal reactor (similar to the one at the top of the Citadel, seen at the end of Half-Life 2). The player arrives just in time to see a portal form to an unknown (and apparently barren, except for antlions) planet. The planet is also seen as a holographic projection or on screens throughout the Combine base. Minerva says that it is unconquered and unexplored by the Combine, although several Dropships are seen coming through the portal.

Minerva asks the player to sabotage the core, by disabling four plasma containers which help regulate and buffer the core's energy levels.  Upon successful completion of the task, Minerva reveals her true intentions and betrays the player. She intends to use the satellite's superheated plasma beam to strike the base with a destructive blast. She informs the player of the base's utter and complete destruction within the first twenty seconds of disabling the cores.  The third episode ends with the player fading to white as Minerva brings about the devastation of the base.

Pegasus
The player survives the blast to the surprise of Minerva, who decides to try and rescue the player if they manage to reach the surface before the satellite recharges for a second blast. The plasma strike has heavily damaged the installation, and headcrabs now roam free throughout the base, infecting Combine Soldiers. The zombies soon become the primary enemies. Many platforms and hallways are blocked or structurally damaged and require the player to break their way through or find a whole new route around. While making their way upwards the player has to solve some environmental puzzles (like blowing a hole in the floor using gas pipes, while fending off an unlimited number of zombies with reprogrammed Combine Turrets).  Upon reaching the surface (now at dusk), the player battles through waves of Fast Zombies, and heads out to the Combine Watchtower, where he makes one last stand against a Combine Gunship, which is preventing the evacuation helicopter from approaching the island. Once the Gunship is destroyed, the evacuation helicopter arrives. The player safely flies off, as another plasma strike annihilates the island.

Out of Time

Foster has stated that the next chapter of the Minerva series will be called "Out of Time", instead of the previous working title "Chronoclasm", and has promised "some freakish gameplay additions...".

Foster has also hinted that he would like to set Out of Time in "a snow-dusted coastal town, complete with its own Citadel." A blog post on the development blog further hinted Out of Time will take place in City 44.

According to Adam Foster, the series was eventually to culminate in the player and MINERVA travelling to a parallel universe in order to prevent a universe-ending catastrophe. They would eventually be forced to collapse that universe, including the alien world glimpsed in Metastasis, but would themselves be erased in the process. However, Foster stated in 2013 that he was unlikely to continue development of Minerva, saying the mod has "been put to sleep for now."

Design
Adam Foster, Minervas designer, is critical of Valve's design of Half-Life 2 maps. His belief is that game developers focus on creating gameplay friendly environments that do not work in an architectural way, "a series of unconnected boxes" says Foster, Minervas environments are built as actual environments (with correctly proportioned structures and areas) with gameplay worked in later. This creates a more open design, in which players may, in places, navigate in multiple ways. Later locations can be seen in earlier stages of the game (along corridors or through windows for example). Map design is the mod's hallmark. While all levels are constructed primarily using Valve's resources, with few new models or textures, Foster follows his own design ideals – that of compact, well designed maps. Although the levels seem huge, as play unfolds, they are in fact very small - wrapping around to use the least space possible. This creates a sense of realism. As pointed out by Planet Halflife:

As a result, Minerva maps have a much shorter load time than maps in the original game. Foster creates the maps in layers. Once a layer is filled he moves the design downwards, which both helps to propel the storyline (a descent into a mysterious shaft) and also makes the best use of space. Visually the maps are of a high quality, with HDR lighting implemented in the latest release, and the environments match those of the official game in look and feel.

The player's Combine opposition are positioned logically, a feat given the vast number of communicating areas in each map. New adversaries don't spawn as soon as the player completes an objective but appear realistically as the episode progresses.

The first Minerva map was inspired by the fully modeled island design of the Halo: Combat Evolved level "The Silent Cartographer".

Foster describes Minerva as an "anti-modification": "The aim isn't to replace as much game content as possible; instead, it's to tell my own apocryphal story set in the Half-Life 2 universe, and to actually release something for the public to play."

The mod's companion website is available in French, German, Spanish, Italian, Polish, and Russian. Localization packs  developed by the LocWorks game localization team were released in November 2008.

Adam Foster was recruited by Valve to work on the Half Life 2: Episode Three development team, and began working for them in October 2008. Foster initially stated his intention to continue working on "Out Of Time" in his spare time. However, in a later interview with Eurogamer, Foster stated that the series would probably not continue.

Foster continues to be employed at Valve and was involved with map designs of Portal 2.

Reception
Minerva has steadily grown in popularity, and was at one point a featured mod on Steam. There have also been various reviews of the mod by independent sites:

Minerva was featured as a Mod of the Week on Planet Half-Life.
Amped News rated it 4.5/5.
An interview with Adam Foster in the February 2006 edition of Computer Gaming World. 
Moddb gave Minerva a Mod Of The Year 2006 Award (5th place).
RockPaperShotgun posted an interview with Adam Foster in October 2007.
RockPaperShotgun featured Minerva: Metastasis on the eight day of its 2007 Advent Game-O-Calendar series.

References

External links
The official Minerva site

2005 video games
Episodic video games
First-person shooters
Source (game engine) mods
Windows games
Windows-only games
Video games set in Europe